Donald Piketh (born 1966) is a former South African international lawn and indoor bowler.

He won a gold medal in the fours at the 1994 Commonwealth Games in Victoria with Robert Rayfield, Alan Lofthouse and Neil Burkett.

References

Living people
South African male bowls players
1966 births
Bowls players at the 1994 Commonwealth Games
Commonwealth Games gold medallists for South Africa
Commonwealth Games medallists in lawn bowls
Medallists at the 1994 Commonwealth Games